Jordan de Melburne is the first recorded Archdeacon of Lewes.

References

Archdeacons of Lewes